Bishops of Kujawy (later known as bishops of Włocławek) are the bishops of the Roman Catholic Diocese of Kujawy (1133–1818), Roman Catholic Diocese of Kujawy–Kalisz (1818–1925) and Roman Catholic Diocese of Włocławek (from 1925).

Bishops of Kujawy (Kruszwica) (966–1156) 
The following are the legendary bishops of Kruszwica mentioned by Jan Długosz. They are not believed to be historical persons:
966–993 – Lucidus
993–1014 – Wawrzyniec
1015–1033 – Marcellinus Marceli
1034–1055 – Wenanty
1056–1081 – Jan Rzymianin
1082–1097 – Romanus/Roman
1097–1111 – Paweł
1111–1128 – Baldwin Gall
1129–1156 – Świdger/Swidger

Bishop of Kujawy / Włocławek

Suffragan
 (auxiliary?) Bishops of Kujawy–Kalisze 
1838–1844 – Józef Joachim Goldtmann
1918–1927 – Władysław Paweł Krynicki
1918–1938 – Wojciech Stanisław Owczarek
1939–1943 – blessed Michał Kozal
1946–1962 – Franciszek Korszyński
1962–1979 – Kazimierz Majdański
1963–1969 – Jan Zaręba
1973–1997 – Czesław Lewandowski
1981–2003 – Roman Andrzejewski
1999–present  – Stanisław Gębicki

Sources 
Jan Fijałek: Ustalenie chronologii biskupów włocławskich, Kraków 1894

Former Roman Catholic dioceses in Europe
 Kujawy
Włocławek